There are two total lunar eclipses occurring in 2018: 

 January 2018 lunar eclipse
 July 2018 lunar eclipse